Stewarts Creek Township is one of thirteen townships in Harnett County, North Carolina, United States. The township had a population of 3,482 according to the 2000 census. It is a part of the Dunn Micropolitan Area, which is also a part of the greater Raleigh–Durham–Cary Combined Statistical Area (CSA) as defined by the United States Census Bureau.

Geographically, Stewarts Creek Township occupies  in southern Harnett County.  There are no incorporated municipalities in Stewarts Creek Township, however, there are several unincorporated communities located here, including Bunnlevel.

Townships in Harnett County, North Carolina
Townships in North Carolina